Anbu may refer to:

 Anbu, Guangdong, a town in Guangdong, China
 Anbu, Iran, a town in Gilan Province, Iran
 Ambu (company), a Danish healthcare company
 Anbu (1953 film), a 1953 film starring Sivaji Ganesan
 Anbu (2003 film), a 2003 film starring Bala
 Anbu (king) (fl c. 25th century BCE), ruler of Sumeria in Dynasty of Mari
 ANBU Black Ops, a fictional organization in the manga series Naruto